Timothy Warren Anglin (August 31, 1822 – May 4, 1896) was a Canadian politician and Speaker of the House of Commons of Canada.

Born in Clonakilty, County Cork, Ireland, Anglin emigrated at the age of 26 as part of the exodus caused by the Great Famine. Following a sectarian riot in New Brunswick between members of the Orange Order and Catholics, Anglin appealed for moderation and unity. This led him to take up the editorship of a new newspaper, The Freeman, in 1849, which made him an influential voice in the colony. He was elected to the Legislative Assembly of New Brunswick in 1861, and became an opponent of Canadian Confederation and of the government of Samuel Leonard Tilley which he helped defeat in 1865. Tilley returned to power the next year, however, with the defeat of the Anti-Confederation Party in the election. Anglin lost his own seat.

New Brunswick entered Confederation as a province in 1867 and Anglin won a seat in the new House of Commons of Canada as a Liberal Member of Parliament (MP) for the riding of Gloucester in the country's first general election.

When the Liberals came to power in the 1874 election, the new Prime Minister of Canada, Alexander Mackenzie, nominated Anglin as Speaker of the House of Commons of Canada.

Anglin's term as Speaker was controversial. The Speaker is expected to act in a non-partisan manner and be above politics, but Anglin used his rulings as Speaker as opportunities to enter into partisan debate. Even more troubling to the opposition was that he retained his position as editor of a partisan newspaper during his term as Speaker, and used his position to write editorials berating the Opposition. Especially controversial was that his newspaper was given government printing contracts. Anglin was accused of violating the Independence of Parliament Act for accepting government printing contracts, and was censured by the House of Commons Committee on Privilege in 1877. Anglin was forced to resign as Speaker and as an MP, but was re-elected to the House of Commons in the by-election that was held to fill his seat. He was successfully renominated by Mackenzie to the position of Speaker.

Anglin's period as Speaker ended with the 1878 election that defeated the Liberal government. He remained in the House of Commons until he lost his seat in the 1882 election. Following his defeat, Anglin moved to Toronto and became editor of the Toronto Tribune. In the 1887 election, he was defeated in his bid to win a seat from the Ontario riding of Simcoe North.

Three of Anglin's nine children were notably successful; Francis Alexander Anglin was Chief Justice of Canada from 1924 to 1933, Arthur Whyte Anglin was a successful lawyer in private practice, and Mary Margaret Anglin became the first internationally renowned Canadian stage actress.

Electoral record 
Simcoe North

References

External links 
 
 

1822 births
1896 deaths
19th-century Irish people
Canadian male journalists
Irish emigrants to pre-Confederation New Brunswick
Journalists from New Brunswick
Politicians from County Cork
Members of the House of Commons of Canada from New Brunswick
Liberal Party of Canada MPs
Speakers of the House of Commons of Canada
Members of the Legislative Assembly of New Brunswick